Khaled Waleed (Arabic:خالد وليد) (born 25 December 1999) is a Qatari footballer. He currently plays for Qatar.

References

External links
 

Qatari footballers
1999 births
Living people
El Jaish SC players
Al-Duhail SC players
Qatar SC players
Qatar Stars League players
Association football midfielders